Xiangliu, full designation 225088 Gonggong I Xiangliu, is the only known moon of the scattered-disc likely dwarf planet 225088 Gonggong. It was discovered by a team of astronomers led by Csaba Kiss during an analysis of archival Hubble Space Telescope images of Gonggong. The discovery team had suspected that the slow rotation of Gonggong was caused by tidal forces exerted by an orbiting satellite. Xiangliu was first identified in archival Hubble images taken with Hubble's Wide Field Camera 3 on 18 September 2010. Its discovery was reported and announced by Gábor Marton, Csaba Kiss, and Thomas Müller at the 48th Meeting of the Division for Planetary Sciences on 17 October 2016. The satellite is named after Xiangliu, a nine-headed Venomous snake monster in Chinese mythology that attended the water god Gonggong as his chief minister.

Observations 

Following the March 2016 discovery that Gonggong was an unusually slow rotator, the possibility was raised that a satellite may have slowed it down via tidal forces. The indications of a possible satellite orbiting Gonggong led Csaba Kiss and his team to analyze archival Hubble observations of Gonggong. Their analysis of Hubble images taken on 18 September 2010 revealed a faint satellite orbiting Gonggong at a distance of at least . The discovery was announced on 17 October 2016, though the satellite was not given a proper provisional designation. The discovery team later also identified the satellite in earlier archival Hubble images taken on 9 November 2009. 

From follow-up Hubble observations in 2017, the absolute magnitude of the satellite is estimated to be at least 4.59 magnitudes dimmer than Gonggong, or  given Gonggong's estimated absolute magnitude of 2.34.

Orbit 

Based on Hubble images of Gonggong and Xiangliu taken in 2009 and 2010, the discovery team constrained Xiangliu's orbital period to between 20 and 100 days. They better determined the orbit with additional Hubble observations in 2017. Xiangliu is believed to be tidally locked to Gonggong. 

Because the observations of Xiangliu only span a small fraction of Gonggong's orbit around the Sun, it is not yet possible to determine whether Xiangliu's orbit is prograde or retrograde. Using the same prograde orbit model, the discovery team has estimated that its orbit is inclined to the ecliptic by about 83 degrees, implying that Gonggong is being viewed at a nearly pole-on configuration under the assumption that Xiangliu's orbit has a low inclination to Gonggong's equator.

The orbit of Xiangliu is highly eccentric. The value of 0.29 is thought to have been caused by either an intrinsically eccentric orbit or by slow tidal evolution, in which the time for its orbit to circularize is comparable to the age of the Solar System. It may have also resulted from the Kozai mechanism, driven by perturbations either from the Sun's tidal forces, or from higher order terms in the gravitational potential of Gonggong due to its oblate shape. The orbital dynamics are thought to be similar to that of Quaoar's satellite, Weywot, which has a moderate eccentricity of about 0.14.

Physical characteristics 
The minimum possible diameter of Xiangliu, corresponding to an albedo of 1, is 36 km. Photometric measurements in 2017 showed that Xiangliu is far less red than Gonggong. The color difference of V–I= between Gonggong (V–I=) and Xiangliu (V–I=) is among the greatest among all known binary trans-Neptunian objects. This large color difference is atypical for trans-Neptunian binary systems: the components of most trans-Neptunian binaries display little color variation.

Name

The satellite is named after Xiangliu, the nine-headed poisonous snake monster and minister of the water god Gonggong in Chinese mythology. The eponymous Xiangliu is known for causing flooding and destruction. When the discoverers of Gonggong proposed choices for a public vote on its name, they purposefully chose figures that had associates that could provide a name for the satellite. Xiangliu's name was chosen by its discovery team led by Csaba Kiss, who had the privilege of naming the satellite. The names of Gonggong and Xiangliu were approved by the International Astronomical Union's Committee on Small Body Nomenclature and were simultaneously announced by the Minor Planet Center on 5 February 2020.

Notes

References 
 

Moons of dwarf planets
Astronomical objects discovered in 2010
225088 Gonggong
Trans-Neptunian satellites